The 1989 Chenoua earthquake occurred on October 29 at  in northern Algeria. The dip-slip event had a moment magnitude of 5.9 and a maximum Mercalli intensity of VIII (Severe). At least 22 were killed and many were injured with total losses of $5 million.

References

Further reading

External links
M6.0 – northern Algeria – United States Geological Survey

1989 earthquakes
1989 in Algeria
Earthquakes in Algeria
1989 disasters in Algeria